Kulawo is a Filipino salad made with either minced banana blossoms (kulawong puso ng saging) or grilled eggplants (kulawong talong) cooked in coconut milk that is distinctively extracted from grated coconut meat toasted on live coals. It is a pre-colonial dish that originates from the provinces of Laguna and Quezon. Kulawo is a type of kilawin and ginataan. It is fully vegan and has a unique smoky taste that has been compared to smoked meat or fish dishes.

Description
The original pre-colonial version of kulawo uses finely diced or julienned banana blossoms that is mixed with salt for a few minutes and then squeezed dry and washed to remove the bitter sap. Grated coconut is then placed in a container with live coals (usually from burning coconut husks) until the grated coconut is toasted brown and emits a slightly burned odor. In modern versions, they can also be toasted briefly in an oven. The toasted grated coconut is then separated from the coals and moistened with vinegar. It is allowed to cool down and then squeezed to extract coconut milk that now has a smoky flavor. The coconut milk is then heated slowly with vinegar (usually coconut or cane vinegar), red onions, salt, and black pepper. Other spices can also be added to taste, including garlic, ginger, shallots, fish sauce, and chili peppers. The coconut milk must be heated slowly and prevented from boiling to avoid curdling. The banana blossoms are then added last and cooked until tender.

A more modern variant uses eggplant (introduced during the Spanish colonial period) that is first grilled until soft and then peeled and mashed.

Variations
Kulawong puso ng saging is also sometimes known as minanok (literally "done like chicken"), due to its texture being similar to shredded chicken. Despite the name, it does not contain any meat.

Some versions do add cooked meat, like pork belly (liempo), especially in adaptations in other regions. But this is non-traditional.

See also

Tortang talong
Poqui poqui
Kinilaw
Tiyula itum

References

External links

Eggplant dishes
Philippine cuisine
Vegetarian dishes of the Philippines
Vegan cuisine
Flower dishes
Foods containing coconut
Salads